Edward Newhouse (November 10, 1911 – November 11, 2002) was a short story author and staff writer for The New Yorker. He was born Ede Ujhazi in Hungary and was married to Dorothy DeLay. Edward wrote proletarian novels in the 1930s, and many short stories about life, and he worked for almost thirty years with the New Yorker. He was a friend of many of the literary giants of the 20th century. His writings from 1929 to 1965 were instructive for both an understanding of the radical mindset and as an example of the late manifestation of American literary realism. He retired from a literary career in the year 1965. He also helped story movies like I Want You and Shadow in the Sky.

Selected bibliography
You Can't Sleep Here (1934)
This is Your Day (1937)
Anything Can Happen (1941) (short stories)
The Hollow of the Wave (1950)
Many Are Called: Forty Two Short Stories (1951)
The Temptation of Roger Heriott (1954)

References

External links
Search listing of writings for the New Yorker
Edward Newhouse: A Preliminary Inventory of His Papers in the Manuscript Collection at the Harry Ransom Humanities Research Center at The University of Texas Libraries

1911 births
2002 deaths
The New Yorker staff writers
American short story writers
Proletarian literature
20th-century American journalists
American male journalists
Hungarian emigrants to the United States